Düzce Province is a province in northwestern Turkey. It is on the coastline of the Black Sea and is traversed by the main highway between Istanbul and Ankara. The main town is Düzce. There are ancient Greek ruins in the province.

Düzce broke off from Bolu province and became a province in its own right after a devastating earthquake in the city in November 1999.

The total population of the province in 2017 was 377,610.

Districts 

Düzce province is divided into 8 districts (capital district in bold):
 Akçakoca
 Çilimli
 Cumayeri
 Düzce
 Gölyaka
 Gümüşova
 Kaynaşlı
 Yığılca

Health
Air pollution in Turkey is a chronic problem here.

Sister Cities 

 Novi Pazar
 East Riding of Yorkshire 
 Dubrovnik 
 Sainshand

See also
East Marmara Development Agency
List of populated places in Düzce Province

References

External links

  Düzce governor's official website
  Düzce municipality's official website
  Düzce weather forecast information

 
States and territories established in 1999